O-1918 is a synthetic compound related to cannabidiol, which is an antagonist at two former orphan receptors GPR18 and GPR55, that appear to be related to the cannabinoid receptors. O-1918 is used in the study of these receptors, which have been found to be targets for a number of endogenous and synthetic cannabinoid compounds, and are thought to be responsible for most of the non-CB1, non-CB2 mediated effects that have become evident in the course of cannabinoid research.

See also 
 Abnormal cannabidiol
 Cannabidiol dimethyl ether
 CID-16020046
 CID-85469571
 O-1602
 Tetrahydrocannabiorcol

References 

Cannabinoids
Cyclohexenes